The National Art Museum of the Republic of Belarus is the largest art museum in Belarus and is located in Minsk. The museum comprises more than thirty thousands works of art which make up twenty various collections and constitutes two main ones: the one of national art and the other of art monuments of various countries of the world.

History 
The State Art Gallery was created on January 24, 1939 under the Resolution of the Council of People's Commissars of Belarus. The gallery took 15 halls of Graduate Agricultural School, former Minsk Girls Gymnasium. Besides divisions of painting, sculpture, and graphics, a separate division of art industry was created by a special order. At this time, the gallery was led by a famous Belarusian painter-ceramist Mikalai Mikhalap.

At the beginning of 1941, the State Art Gallery’s funds and stocks had numbered nearly 2711 art works out of which four hundred were on display. The fate of the whole collection was unfavorable during the first days of the Great Patriotic War. In a short time it would disappear without a trace.

After the War, a small part of the works of art was returned, mainly those which had been at the exhibitions in Russia before the War. In spite of the postwar devastation, when Minsk lay in ruins, the Government of Belarus allocated sums of money for purchasing works of art for the Gallery. In August 1945, the canvases by Boris Kustodiev, Vasily Polenov, Karl Briullov and Isaak Levitan were obtained. In 1993 the museum was renamed the National Art Museum of the Republic of Belarus.

Former directors 

 Nikolay Mikholap (? - 1944?)
 Alena Aladava (1944 - 1977)
 Yury Karachun (1977 - ?)

Gallery

External links

Museums in Minsk
Art museums and galleries in Belarus
Art museums established in 1939
1939 establishments in the Soviet Union